Odirile Modimokoane (born 10 July 2001) is a South African cricketer. He made his Twenty20 debut on 10 October 2021, for Dolphins in the 2021–22 CSA Provincial T20 Knock-Out tournament. Prior to his Twenty20 debut, he was named in South Africa's squad for the 2020 Under-19 Cricket World Cup. He made his first-class debut on 18 November 2021, for Dolphins in the 2021–22 CSA 4-Day Series. He made his List A debut on 27 March 2022, for Dolphins in the 2021–22 CSA One-Day Cup.

References

External links
 

2001 births
Living people
South African cricketers
Dolphins cricketers
Place of birth missing (living people)